Mark Gerald Elworth Jr. (born August 6, 1976) is an American freelance musician, businessman, cannabis rights activist, frequent candidate for public office, and rockhound. Elworth was the Libertarian Party candidate for Governor of Nebraska in 2014 and was the Legal Marijuana Now candidate for Vice President of the United States in 2016.

Elworth, who petitioned in the past for ballot access for the Nebraska Green Party, led a successful statewide petition drive to acquire ballot access for a Nebraska Legal Marijuana NOW Party.

Elworth, who resides in Omaha, Nebraska, is state party chairperson of Nebraska Legal Marijuana NOW.

Personal life
When Mark Elworth was young, he was arrested several times for cannabis possession. He told a reporter for The Daily Nebraskan that even though the charges were misdemeanors, the record of infractions has haunted him as an adult.

Elworth, who graduated from the University of Nebraska Omaha, operated a free community garden in South Omaha, and has been a volunteer coordinator during petition drives for several state political parties. A single father of one child, Elworth is state party chairperson of Nebraska Legal Marijuana NOW.

Born in Omaha, Nebraska, where he often points to as his permanent address, Elworth is known for leading a nomadic lifestyle, and he has taken up temporary residency at various locations, mostly in the Midwest and Western United States, including: Council Bluffs, Iowa; Boulder, Colorado; Eugene, Oregon, and Las Vegas, Nevada.

Political career

Green Party
Elworth got involved in politics in the 1990s, volunteering for the Green Party during the 2000 Ralph Nader presidential campaign. In 2016, Elworth was a Green Party candidate for Nebraska Legislature.

Libertarian Party
Elworth met the Libertarian Party during the Nebraska branch's 2010 ballot access petition drive.

Elworth was the Libertarian Party candidate for Governor of Nebraska in 2014. He campaigned on a platform of marijuana legalization, and cutting corporate welfare. Elworth spent $500.00, saying that he was running a grassroots campaign and did not accept any large contributions.

In 2018, Elworth ran for US Senate as a Libertarian candidate but left the race before the primary.

Legal Marijuana Now Party
In 2015–2016, Elworth petitioned for a Marijuana Party of Nebraska to be officially recognized by the state. To make the ballot, he needed 5,397 signatures statewide. In July 2016, the party turned in 9,000 signatures to the Nebraska Secretary of State. However, the Secretary of State said that half of the signatures were invalid, falling short of the 5,397 needed.

In 2016, Elworth changed the name of the Nebraska party to Legal Marijuana NOW.

Elworth was the Legal Marijuana Now Party candidate for Vice President of the United States in 2016. His name appeared on ballots in Iowa, and Minnesota.

After an unsuccessful attempt to make it onto Nebraska ballots in 2016, Elworth began circulating petitions for 2020 ballot access for a Nebraska Legal Marijuana NOW Party in September 2016.

Elworth said the group planned to collect double the number of signatures they submitted in 2016, to ensure their success. In September 2017, Elworth told a television reporter that Legal Marijuana NOW Party had gathered signatures of 10,000 registered Nebraska voters.

Independent candidate
Elworth, of Council Bluffs, was nominated by petition to run independently for U.S. House of Representatives from Iowa’s 3rd congressional district, in 2018, as an independent candidate under the banner of “Legal Medical Now.”

2020s activism

Democratic Party
In 2020, Elworth ran for Congress in Nebraska’s Third District. Elworth was the only person to file in the district for the Democratic Party primary, and was declared the winner. Elworth had a falling-out with the Chair of the Nebraska Democratic Party, Jane Kleeb. Elworth claimed Kleeb and the Democratic Party refused to support his candidacy, while Kleeb said Elworth failed to complete party paperwork. Elworth stated that he intended to switch parties and run as the candidate of Legal Marijuana Now Party in the district. Elworth told a reporter, “I consider myself pretty moderate on a lot of issues. I’m a little conservative on money issues. I’m more liberal on social issues. I’m a constitutionalist.” Elworth said, “I believe in people’s rights and equal rights for everybody. I’m not a true Democrat, but I’m not a Republican either.” Elworth received 18% in a three-way race, in the November 2020 General Election.

MAGA Patriots Party
Early in the month of February 2021, Elworth filed paperwork to establish a MAGA Patriots Party, headquartered in North Platte, Nebraska. Elworth said the state Elections Division denied his filing arbitrarily, but Secretary of State Bob Evnen said Elworth’s filing was deficient. Elworth told a reporter that he was still working on getting his own Legal Marijuana NOW Party recognized by the state of Nebraska.

Nebraska Legal Marijuana NOW Party
On April 21, 2021, Legal Marijuana NOW gained official recognition as a state political party in Nebraska, earning the party ballot access for their candidates, and allowing Legal Marijuana NOW Party to register voters. And Elworth became chairperson of Nebraska Legal Marijuana NOW.

Elworth was a Legal Marijuana NOW candidate for United States Representative from Nebraska’s 3rd Congressional District in 2022.

Political candidacy
Elworth has run numerous times for various offices, including:
 Governor of Nebraska in 2014
 Vice-president of the United States, and State Representative from Nebraska’s 13th legislative district, in 2016
 Omaha Third District city council member in 2017
 United States Representative from Iowa’s 3rd congressional district in 2018
 United States Representative from Nebraska’s 3rd congressional district in 2020, and 2022

Further reading
 Wilkinson, Melanie (July 12, 2014) Nebraska governor hopeful Mark Elworth Jr. looks to fuel Libertarian Party’s fire Omaha World-Herald
 Walton, Don (October 12, 2014) Elworth is third governor candidate Lincoln Journal Star
 Ozaki, Andrew (October 17, 2014) Mark Elworth Jr.’s shaking up election with unflinching honesty KETV 7 ABC News
 Robinson, Travis (September 20, 2015) Omaha Man Petitions for Marijuana Political Party KNOP-TV
 Summers, Brandon (June 19, 2020) Elworth leaving Democrats for Legal Marijuana Now Party The Grand Island Independent

References

External links
 Ballotpedia: Mark Elworth Jr.

1976 births
Living people
American cannabis activists
Candidates in the 2022 United States House of Representatives elections
Cannabis political party politicians
People from Nebraska
People convicted of cannabis offenses
Politicians from Omaha, Nebraska
University of Nebraska Omaha alumni
Nebraska Democrats
Nebraska Libertarians